Psychopathics From Outer Space Part 2 is a 2003 compilation album featuring rare and previously unreleased material by Psychopathic Records artists, including Insane Clown Posse, Twiztid, Anybody Killa, Blaze Ya Dead Homie, Esham, Jumpsteady, and Zug Izland.  Guest appearances are made by Bushwick Bill, TNT, Fresh Kid Ice, and Fish & Grits.

Overview
This is the only PFOS album that features Esham, who left Psychopathic after releasing three albums, Zug Izland, who left Psychopathic after releasing two albums, Anybody Killa, who left Psychopathic but rejoined later, and Jumpsteady, who retired from music after releasing two albums.

Track listing

References

2003 compilation albums
Record label compilation albums
Psychopathic Records compilation albums
Hip hop compilation albums